So You Won't Squawk (1941) is the eighth short subject starring Buster Keaton made for Columbia Pictures.

Plot
Handyman Eddie (Buster Keaton) is mistaken for gangster Louie the Wolf (Eddie Fetherston).  Louie encourages this deception and lets rival gangster Slugger McGraw (Matt McHugh) think Eddie is him.  Slugger attempts to kill Eddie many times.  After one final attempt a car chase ensues with Eddie throwing various items out the window to get the attention of the police.

Cast
 Buster Keaton as Eddie
 Eddie Fetherston as Louie the Wolf
 Matt McHugh as Slugger McGraw
 Bud Jamison as Tom
 Vernon Dent as the bartender
 Hank Mann as a workman
 Edmund Cobb as a policeman

Production
The chase scene is a reworking of Buster's final chase from his feature Le Roi des Champs-Élysées (1934).

See also
 Buster Keaton filmography

External links

 So You Won't Squawk at the International Buster Keaton Society

References

1941 films
1941 comedy films
Columbia Pictures short films
American black-and-white films
Films directed by Del Lord
American comedy short films
1940s English-language films
1940s American films